Blockbuster is a 2018 French comedy film about a man trying to win back his superhero-loving girlfriend after she dumps him over a video he made to amuse his ailing dad. The film was released worldwide on 24 January 2018 by Netflix although departed in January 2021.

Cast
 Syrus Shahidi as Jéremy
 Charlotte Gabris as Lola
 Tom Hygreck as Mathias
 Gunther Love as Mickael (as Sylvain Quimène)
 Laura Boujenah as Sarah
 Foëd Amara as Sam
 Lionel Abelanski as Simon

Production
The film was originally getting off the ground thanks to the crowdfunding platform KissKissBankBank before Netflix stepped in.

References

External links
 
 
 

2018 films
Films about comics
French comedy films
French-language Netflix original films
2010s French films